UCK may refer to:

 Ubuntu Customization Kit, for a live CD of the Ubuntu operating system
 Uckfield railway station, East Sussex, England
 Kosovo Liberation Army
 National Liberation Army